Discovery Place Nature, formerly Charlotte Nature Museum, is located at 1658 Sterling Road in Charlotte, North Carolina.  The Museum features interactive nature exhibits and live animal displays, including a butterfly pavilion, live species, insects, and a variety of native North Carolina animals.  The Museum offers many education programs for schools, parents and the public, and features a summer camp program.  Daily programming including puppet shows and hands-on activities provide the opportunity for structured learning and informal play.

The museum is located adjacent to the 98-acre Freedom Park and the Little Sugar Creek Greenway.

Discovery Place Nature is part of the Discovery Place brand, an organization of museums in North Carolina that also includes Discovery Place Science, a hands-on science museum in uptown Charlotte, and Discovery Place Kids in Huntersville, NC and Rockingham, NC.

References

External links
 Discovery Place Nature

Museums in Charlotte, North Carolina
Nature centers in North Carolina
Natural history museums in North Carolina
Children's museums in North Carolina